The Hotel Tamanaco is a historic hotel located in Caracas, Venezuela, opened in 1953.

History
The Hotel Tamanaco was developed in the early 1950s, and constructed at a cost of $8m, as part of an effort by the Venezuelan government to boost the tourist trade in the country. It was a partnership between the Intercontinental Hotels division of Pan American World Airways and the Ministry of Development, who provided financial backing. The hotel's opening, on December 11, 1953, was attended by Venezuelan dictator Marcos Pérez Jiménez. The hotel was designed by John Wellborn Root Jr. of the firm Holabird, Root & Burgee, who also designed the Palmolive Building in Chicago. Collaborating on the design was local architect Gustavo Guinand Van der Walle. The hotel contained 400 rooms and cost $8,000,000 to build. The hotel was so successful that a 300-room addition was added soon after.

Designed as a modern luxury hotel, it was reached by a newly opened road, the Autopista del Este (East Highway). In 1957 it was the subject of a set of postage stamps issued by the post office of Venezuela.

The hotel was continuously operated by InterContinental for 68 years. It was rebranded with the chain's name as the Hotel Tamanaco Inter-Continental in the 1970s, then as the Tamanaco Inter-Continental Caracas in the 1990s, and finally the InterContinental Tamanaco Caracas Hotel in 2003. In August 2021, the chain ended its relationship with the hotel, because the property was unable to meet the company's required brand standards, due to the ongoing Venezuelan economic crisis.

References

External links 

InterContinental hotels
Projects by Holabird & Root
Hotels in Venezuela
Hotel buildings completed in 1953
1953 establishments in Venezuela
Hotels established in 1953